Cărpinet is a commune in Bihor County, Crișana, Romania with a population of 2,174 people. It is composed of four villages: Călugări (Kalugyer), Cărpinet, Izbuc (Vaskohszohodol) and Leheceni (Lehecsény).

References

Communes in Bihor County
Localities in Crișana